The Second Decade (1993–2003) is Michael W. Smith's eighteenth album. This is Smith's second greatest hits compilation album, picking up where his first greatest hits compilation, The First Decade (1983–1993), left off.

Track listing

Missing hits
As with The First Decade (1983–1993), several songs that charted on CCM magazine's CHR, Adult Contemporary, and Inspirational charts were omitted from this compilation due to time constraints. These hit singles were:
"I'll Be Around" (No. 3 on CHR, No. 1 on AC)
"A Little Stronger Everyday" (No. 5 on CHR, No. 2 on AC)
"Someday" (No. 3 on CHR, No. 5 on AC)
"Jesus Is the Answer" (No. 9 on CHR, No. 4 on AC, No. 11 on Inspo)
"Christmastime" (No. 12 on AC)
"Let Me Show You the Way" (No. 16 on CHR, No. 1 on AC)
"I Will Be Your Friend" (No. 2 on AC, No. 7 on Inspo)
"I Still Have the Dream" (No. 7 on CHR)
"Worth It All" (No. 7 on CHR, No. 4 on AC)
"Breathe" (No. 1 on Inspo)
"Step by Step/Forever We Will Sing" (No. 21 on Billboard Christian Songs)

The Second Decade DVD
A Limited Edition version of the album was also released, which included The Second Decade DVD. This disc contained the following music videos:

The 'extras' section includes a discography, as well as the following features:

Personnel 
Signs
 Michael W. Smith – lead and backing vocals, acoustic piano, keyboards, Hammond B3 organ, acoustic guitar
 Glenn Pearce – electric guitars
 Anthony Sallee – bass
 Raymond Boyd – drums, percussion

Raging Sea
 Michael W. Smith – lead vocals, acoustic piano
 The Nashville String Machine –orchestra
 David Hamilton – orchestra arrangements and conductor 
 Carl Gorodetzky – contractor
 Eberhard Ramm – music copyist 
 Nirva Dorsaint – backing vocals

Production 
 Michael W. Smith – executive producer, producer (1, 2, 4-7, 11, 12, 14, 15)
 Mark Heimmerman – producer (2, 5, 6, 7)
 Patrick Leonard – producer (3, 8, 9, 10)
 Bryan Lenox – producer (4, 14)
 Tom Laune – producer (11)
 Brown Bannister – producer (13)
 Rob Burrell – recording (1, 15), mixing (1, 15), remixing (8)
 Hank Williams – mastering 
 Jason McArthur – A&R 
 Laurie Melick – A&R production 
 Scott Hughes – art direction 
 Stephanie McBrayer – art direction, styling
 Tim Parker – cover design, graphic design 
 Ron Roark – graphic design 
 Andrew Southam – photography 
 Russ Harrington – additional photography 
 Sheila Davis – make-up
 Traci Sgrnoli – hair stylist 
 Carol Maxwell – additional hair styling and make-up
 Blanton Harrell Cooke & Corzine – management 
 Recorded and Mixed at Skywalker Sound (Marin County, California); Deer Valley Studio and The Sound Kitchen (Franklin, Tennessee).
 Mastered at MasterMix (Nashville, Tennessee).

The Second Decade DVD
 Ken Carpenter – producer, DVD design
 Rod Carpenter – DVD design, DVD authoring
 Stephanie McBrayer – visual media director
 Laurie Melick – production manager

Chart performance

References

2003 compilation albums
Michael W. Smith compilation albums